Maciej Bykowski (born 22 February 1977 in Elbląg) is a Polish professional footballer.

References

 

1977 births
Living people
People from Elbląg
Polish footballers
Lech Poznań players
OKS Stomil Olsztyn players
Polonia Warsaw players
Panathinaikos F.C. players
OFI Crete F.C. players
Górnik Łęczna players
Veria F.C. players
Polonia Bytom players
ŁKS Łódź players
Association football forwards
Sportspeople from Warmian-Masurian Voivodeship